Smart environments link computers and other smart devices to everyday settings and tasks. Smart environments include smart homes, smart cities and smart manufacturing.

Introduction
Smart environments are an extension of pervasive computing. According to Mark Weiser, pervasive computing promotes the idea of a world that is connected to sensors and computers. These sensors and computers are integrated with everyday objects in peoples' lives and are connected through networks.

Definition
Cook and Das define smart environment as "a small world where different kinds of smart device are continuously working to make inhabitants' lives more comfortable." Smart environments aim to satisfy the experience of individuals from every environment, by replacing the hazardous work, physical labor, and repetitive tasks with automated agents. 
Poslad
differentiates three different kinds of smart environments for systems, services and devices: virtual (or distributed) computing environments, physical environments and human environments, or a hybrid combination of these:
 Virtual computing environments enable smart devices to access pertinent services anywhere and anytime.
 Physical environments may be embedded with a variety of smart devices of different types including tags, sensors and controllers and have different form factors ranging from nano- to micro- to macro-sized.
 Human environments: humans, either individually or collectively, inherently form a smart environment for devices. However, humans may themselves be accompanied by smart devices such as mobile phones, use surface-mounted devices (wearable computing) and contain embedded devices (e.g., pacemakers to maintain a healthy heart operation or AR contact lenses).

Features
Smart environments are broadly classified to have the following features
 Remote control of devices, like power line communication systems to control devices.
 Device Communication,  using middleware, and Wireless communication to form a picture of connected environments.
 Information Acquisition/Dissemination from sensor networks
 Enhanced Services by Intelligent Devices
 Predictive and Decision-Making capabilities

Technologies
To build a smart environment, involves technologies of
 Wireless communication
 Algorithm design, signal prediction & classification, information theory
 Multilayered software architecture, Corba, middleware
 Speech recognition
 Image processing, image recognition
 Sensors design, calibration, motion detection, temperature, pressure sensors, accelerometers
 Semantic Web and knowledge graphs
 Adaptive control, Kalman filters
 Computer networking
 Parallel processing
 Operating systems

Existing projects
The Aware Home Research Initiative at Georgia Tech "is devoted to the multidisciplinary exploration of emerging technologies and services based in the home" and was launched in 1998 as one of the first "living laboratories."
The MavHome (Managing an Adaptive Versatile Home) project, at UT Arlington, is a smart environment-lab with state-of-the-art algorithms and protocols used to provide a customized, personal environment to the users of this space. The MavHome project, in addition to providing a safe environment, wants to reduce the energy consumption of the inhabitants.
Other projects include House_n at the MIT Media Lab and many others.

See also
 Building automation
 Device ecology
 Home robot
 Intelligent building
 List of home automation topics
 Smart, connected products
 Ubiquitous computing

References

Automation
Building engineering
Ubiquitous computing